Two total lunar eclipses occurred in 1975: 

 25 May 1975 lunar eclipse
 18 November 1975 lunar eclipse

See also 
 List of 20th-century lunar eclipses
 Lists of lunar eclipses